Judy Joo is a chef and television personality. She is best known as being the host of Food Network's "Korean Food Made Simple" and an Iron Chef UK and her restaurant Seoul Bird in London. Joo splits her time between New York City, London, and Asia.

Career 
Joo graduated from Columbia University with a Bachelor of Science degree in Industrial Engineering and Operations Research. She began a career in the banking industry working at Goldman Sachs and then Morgan Stanley as an institutional fixed income derivatives saleswoman.

However, she switched careers and began working as a chef after attending The French Culinary Institute, (Pastry Arts) in 2004 and graduating at the top of her class. She then went to work at Saveur magazine in the test kitchens as well as in editorial. She also worked at Slow Food USA, where she founded their first inner city Slow Food in Schools program, "Harvest Time in Harlem".

A move to London led her to restaurants, where she worked at Gordon Ramsay's restaurants, including Maze, Petrus, Gordon Ramsay Restaurant, Gordon Ramsay at Claridge's and The Boxwood Café. She has also completed "stages" in the restaurants The French Laundry and The Fat Duck.
In January 2015, she opened up her own restaurant in London called Jinjuu in Soho. Jinjuu was widely recognized to be London's premier modern Korean restaurant. Prior to that she was the executive chef for the Playboy Club London.

Media 
Joo was one of the four Iron Chefs on the cooking show Iron Chef UK and was a resident judge on season four of the Food Network show The Next Iron Chef.

See also 
 Korean Americans in New York City

References

External links 
 
 Out of the Fire, Into the Frying Pan, by Judy Joo, Wall Street Journal, January 23, 2009

American derivatives traders
American expatriates in England
American people of Korean descent
American television chefs
Columbia School of Engineering and Applied Science alumni
Food Network chefs
Kent Place School alumni
Living people
Place of birth missing (living people)
American women chefs
International Culinary Center alumni
Year of birth missing (living people)
21st-century American women